Pièrre Lecoq is a Belgian philologist, historian, and Iranologist.

Born in 1939, Pierre Lecoq is a linguist and philologist trained by Jacques Duchesne-Guillemin at the University of Liège. Lecoq first devoted his work to ancient Iranian languages, mainly to Avestan philology and Old Persian epigraphy. His diachronic approach to Iranian languages, enriched by his in-depth knowledge of Indo-Iranian and Middle Iranian languages, as well as his studies on the historical phonology and paleography of Old Persian cuneiform, have resulted in the presentation of a full translation of Achaemenid inscriptions (2020), in which he incorporated the parallel versions in Elamite and Babylonian. Lecoq's French translation of the Avesta (Paris, 2016)  is among his major recent works.

In the field of Iranian dialectology, Lecoq has published widely on living Iranian languages. This includes a description of the Sivandi language spoken in Fars (1979) and a voluminous study on the dialects spoken in ancient Carmania, which he names Kermanian dialects (2002). Lecoq has also made a hypothesis on the initial habitat of the Kurdish language.

In the field of Persian language and literature, Lecoq recently published a French translation of the Shahnameh, a sequel to the 19th century translation by Julius von Mohl.

A festschrift, with contributions by his colleagues and student, was published in honor of Piere Lecoq in 2016.

Lecoq was awarded with the 12th Farabi International Award;

Works

Books
 L’épigraphie achéménide vieux-perse. Grammaire, textes, glossaire, Paris, Geuthner, 2020.
 L’épigraphie arsacide et sassanide : parthe et moyen-perse. Grammaire, textes, glossaire, Paris, Geuthner, 2020.
 Les langues iraniennes. Manuel de linguistique et de philologie iranienne, Paris, Geuthner, 2020.
 L’épigraphie achéménide vieux-perse. Grammaire, textes, glossaire, Paris, Geuthner, 2020.
 Ferdowsi, Shâhnâmeh. Le Livre des Rois, traduit du persan en vers libres et rimées, Paris, Les Belles Lettres/Geuthner, 2019 (prix R. et T. Ghirshman de l'AIBL, 2020 ; prix Iraj Afshâr 2020).
 Les Livres de l’Avesta. Les textes sacrés des mazdéens ou zoroastriens. Introduction à la religion mazdéenne, traduction intégrale et annotations, Paris, Le Cerf, 2016 (Prix E. Benvensite de l’AIBL, 2018).
 Recherches sur les dialectes kermaniens, (Acta Iranica, 39), Louvain, Peeters, 2002.
 Les inscriptions achéménides, Paris, Gallimard, 1997 (traduit en persan Katibehāye Haxāmaneši, Tehrān, 1381, [2003]).
 Le dialecte de Sivand, Wiesbaden, Reichert, 1979.

Selected articles
 “La langue des inscriptions achéménides”, Acta Iranica 2, 1974, p. 55-62.
 “Le problème de l’écriture cunéiforme vieux-perse”, Acta Iranica 3, 1974, p. 25-107.
 “Le dialecte d’Abyāne”, Studia Iranica 3, 1974, p. 51-63.
 “Le dialecte d’Abu Zeyd Ābād”, Acta Iranica 5, 1975, p. 15-38.
 “Un problème de religion achéménide : Ahura Mazda ou Xvarnah ?”, Acta Iranica, 23, 1984, p. 301-326.
 “Le mot farnah et les Scythes”, Comptes rendus de l’Académie des Inscriptions et Belles-Lettres, 1987, p. 671-682.
 “Les dialectes caspiens et les dialectes du nord-ouest de l’Iran”, Compendium Linguarum Iranicarum, Wiesbaden : Reichert, 1989, p. 296-312.
 “Les dialectes du centre de l’Iran”, Compendium Linguarum Iranicarum, Wiesbaden, Reichert, 1989, p. 313-326.
 “Les dialectes du sud-ouest de l’Iran”, Compendium Linguarum Iranicarum, Wiesbaden, Reichert, 1989, p. 341-349.
 “Le classement des langues irano-aryennes occidentales”, Études irano-aryennes offertes à Gilbert Lazard, Studia Iranica, Cahier 7, Paris, 1989, pp. 247–64.
 “Paradis en vieux perse ?”, Contribution à l’Histoire de l’Iran. Mélanges J. Parrot, Paris, 1990, p. 209-213.
 “Observations sur le sens du mot dahyu dans les inscriptions achéménides”, Transeuphratène, 3, 1990, p. 131-139.
 “Un aspect de la politique religieuse de Gaumata le Mage”, Au Carrefour des Religions, Mélange Ph. Gignoux, Bures-sur-Yvette, p. 183-186.
 “The Place of Kurdish among the Iranian Languages”, Acta Iranica, 54, 2013, p. 89-103.
 “La grammaire historique du kurde”, The Journal of Kurdish Studies, II, 1996–97, p. 31-36.
 “The Place of Kurdish among the Iranian Languages, Acta Iranica, 54, 2013, p. 89-103
 “Le –a final en vieux perse”, dans Studia Philologica Iranica. Gherardo Gnoli Memorial Volume, Rome, 2017, p. 217-222.

References 

 École Pratique des Hautes Études 
 Céline Redard, "Pierre Lecoq, Les livres de l’Avesta. Textes sacrés des Zoroastriens". https://www.cairn.info/revue-archives-de-sciences-sociales-des-religions-2017-4-page-385.htm
Philippe Swennen. Comptes rendus. Pierre Lecoq (éd.). Les livres de l’Avesta. Les textes sacrés des Zoroastriens, trad. par P. Lecoq, Paris, Éd. du Cerf, 2016. https://www.cairn.info/revue-annales-2019-3-page-844.htm

 H. Borjian. "Recherches sur les dialectes kermaniens (Iran Central)". Studia Iranica, 2005. https://www.academia.edu/8075080

External links
 C. Redard (edited), Des contrées avestiques à Mahabad via Bisotun. Études offertes en hommage à Pierre Lecoq, Neuchâtel, Recherches et Publications, 2016.
 École Pratique des Hautes Études 
OCLC WorldCat Identities. http://worldcat.org/identities/lccn-n79136977/

1939 births
Living people
Place of birth missing (living people)
Belgian philologists
Belgian Iranologists
University of Liège alumni
20th-century philologists
21st-century philologists